Redlingfield Priory was a medieval nunnery in Redlingfield, Suffolk, England. It was closed in the 1530s.

The parish church, which dates back to Anglo-Saxon times, is thought to have been used by nuns. There are a few other remains, including a building that is now a barn.

References

Monasteries in Suffolk
Nunneries in England